Rufus Baker (September 20, 1918 –  June 22, 1992) was an American baseball shortstop in the Negro leagues. He played from 1943 to 1950 with the New York Black Yankees.

References

External links
 and Seamheads

New York Black Yankees players
1918 births
1992 deaths
20th-century African-American sportspeople
Baseball infielders